USS Port Royal may refer to:

  was a sidewheel steamer gunboat commissioned in 1862, active in the Civil War, and decommissioned 1866
Commissioned in 1992
  is a Ticonderoga-class guided missile cruiser, commissioned in 1994

United States Navy ship names